The 1992 Giro del Trentino was the 16th edition of the Tour of the Alps cycle race and was held on 12 May to 15 May 1992. The race started in Arco and finished in Riva del Garda. The race was won by Claudio Chiappucci.

General classification

References

1992
1992 in road cycling
1992 in Italian sport